The Episcopal Diocese of Arizona is the diocese of the Episcopal Church in the United States of America which has jurisdiction over most of Arizona. It is in Province VIII.

Jennifer Anne Reddall is the current bishop. Her seat is at Trinity Cathedral, Phoenix.

History
The Episcopal Diocese of Arizona was established by General Convention in 1959, but its history began 100 years before. Here are some important dates:
 1865: Arizona and Nevada were constituted a Missionary Jurisdiction.
 1874: Arizona is separated from Nevada and is joined into a Missionary Jurisdiction with New Mexico.
 1880: The first convention of the Missionary District of New Mexico and Arizona was held at the Exchange Hotel, Albuquerque, New Mexico.
 1881: St. Paul's, the first Episcopal church building in Arizona was erected in Tombstone with help from Endicott Peabody. St. Paul's is the oldest non-Roman Catholic Church in Arizona.
 1889: Trinity Church in Phoenix was completed and held its first service on the first Sunday in January.
 1892: Arizona and New Mexico were made separate Missionary Jurisdictions.
 1897: The Hospital of the Good Shepherd was founded by Miss Thackara among the Navajos at Fort Defiance.
 1907: St. Luke's Home for tubercular patients was founded in Phoenix.
 August 18, 1931: The Arizona Church Conference Center (Chapel Rock was added to the name in 1995) was bought and paid for with $13,972.85 by Bishop Mitchell.
 1959: The Episcopal Diocese of Arizona was established by General Convention.

List of Bishops of Arizona

External links

 The Episcopal Diocese of Arizona
 Trinity Cathedral
 Chapel Rock
 Journal of the Annual Convocation of the Protestant Episcopal Church in the Missionary District of Arizona

Arizona
Diocese of Arizona
Christian organizations established in 1959
Province 8 of the Episcopal Church (United States)